Turba is a word used in Latin and Arabic languages. Its Latin meaning is uproar or crowd.

Turba is a word means high carbon containing soil which is a precursor of coal anthracite and even rare gems Black Diamond Mines Regional Preserve

Latin word and derivatives 
 means in Latin either uproar and disturbance, or crowd.

Relating to the meaning of "crowd", it may refer more specifically to any text in the biblical Passion of Jesus which is spoken by any group of people, including the disciples, the Jews, or the soldiers. In musical settings it has been broadened to refer to any direct address in the Passion, except the words of Jesus.

The term was further used during the Sandinista regime of Nicaragua in the late 1970s and 1980s, referring to crowds of boisterous, sometimes violent supporters.

Arabic word and derivatives 
In Arabic turba has two meanings. One is that of a tomb, plot in a cemetery, or mausoleum. It has been adopted with a similar meaning into Turkish as Türbe.

The second, related meaning, is that of earth, dirt, soil, ground. Shi'as may put their foreheads on a piece of clay ("dust") during prayers, which they call "turba", also written "turbah".

See also
 Turbah
 Türbe
 Disturbance (disambiguation)
 Turbulence (disambiguation)

References

External links

 Kurt von Fischer. "Turba", Grove Music Online, ed. L. Macy (accessed November 15, 2006), grovemusic.com  (subscription access).

Holy Week
Sandinista National Liberation Front